"Here I Am" is the first single by Swedish singer-songwriter and former lead singer of the group Ace of Base, Jenny Berggren. It was released as the first official single from her first solo album, My Story, in May 2010. Beside the main version of the song, there are also two remixes by Stockholm Sound. The "Sthlm Sound Facility Remix" was featured as a second track on the single CD and the "Sthlm Sound Radio Remix" was featured on My Story.

Music video
The music video for the song is a simplistic video of Jenny in different outfits over white and black backgrounds.

Track listings

Original release
 CD single
 "Here I Am (Main Version)"
 "Here I Am (Sthlm Sound Facility Remix)"

Charts

References

2010 singles
2010 songs
Songs written by Jenny Berggren
Songs written by Simon Petrén